Allyson Parsons (born 1965) is a South Australian landscape artist.

Biography
Allyson was born on Yorke Peninsula in South Australia, the daughter of Wolford Parsons and Marie Parsons, a former art teacher. She was born profoundly deaf, and her parents were faced with the prospect of moving from the farm which they had worked hard to establish in degraded, salt-affected soil. But she had learned to lip-read and with patience and hard work and help from the local school learned to speak clearly.

She has been painting from her youth and has been a successful exhibitor locally and in Adelaide for over 25 years. She lives near Port Vincent, South Australia with her family which includes two sons, one of which is also an incredible painter.

References

External links
Allyson Parsons website

1965 births
Living people
Australian landscape painters
Australian women painters
20th-century Australian women artists
20th-century Australian artists
21st-century Australian women artists
21st-century Australian artists